Ann Roth is an American costume designer known for her work in film, television and the Broadway stage.

Major associations

Academy Awards

British Academy Film Awards

Primetime Emmy Awards

Tony Awards

Industry awards

Costume Designers Guild Awards

Critics' Choice Movie Awards

Drama Desk Award

Satellite Awards

Honorary Awards

References 

American costume designers